William Barry Pennington (9 July 1923 – 5 March 1968) was a British mathematician best known for his work on Ramanujan's tau function.

Pennington was born in Bawtry, Yorkshire.  He was educated at Loughborough Grammar School, and Jesus College, Cambridge.  During World War II he served as a Radar Officer in the RNVR, before returning to Cambridge to complete his doctorate under Albert Edward Ingham.  After completing his doctorate, he spent two years at Harvard University, returning to a Research Fellowship at Jesus in 1952.  He was appointed Reader in mathematics at Westfield College, University of London in 1953.  In 1961 he was appointed Professor of Pure Mathematics at University College of Wales, Aberystwyth, in succession to V.C. Morton, and where he remained until his death, aside from the 1959–60 academic year which he spent at McMaster University in Hamilton, Ontario. Tau

Selected publications

References

External links 
 
 http://www.nature.com/nature/journal/v219/n5150/abs/219207b0.html
  

Number theorists
20th-century British mathematicians
1923 births
1968 deaths
People educated at Loughborough Grammar School
People from Bawtry
Academics of Westfield College
Academics of Aberystwyth University